Ciscandra Nostalghia, known by her stage name Nostalghia, is an American singer and songwriter.

In 2014, she released her first album, Chrysalis, written with collaborator and multi-instrumentalist Roy Gnan. Nostalghia co-wrote and performed two songs for the 2017 film John Wick: Chapter 2.  She also appeared in the film.  In 2018, Nostalghia released the single "Little White Moment".Early life
Nostalghia was born in Southern California and raised by her Persian mother and her father, who is of Russian heritage. 

Discography
Studio LPsI Am Robot Hear Me Glitch (2010)Chrysalis (2014)Imago (2018)

EPsB Sides for the Brokenhearted: Vol 1 (2018)Wicked Woman'' (2019)

Singles
"Who You Talkin' To Man?" (2014)
"God Be You" (2017)
"Plastic Heart" (2017)
"Coronation" (2017) 
"Little White Moment" (2018)

Touring
2014 Festivals
Soundwave, February–March 2014
Austin City Limits, September 2014
Sunset Strip Music Festival, September 2014
Riot Fest, October 2014

2014 Tours
with 30 Seconds to Mars, January 2014
with Crosses†††, May 2014
with AFI, October 2014

2015 Tours
with TV on the Radio, April 2015

2017 Tours
with Poptone, May 2017

References

External links
Official website

Year of birth missing (living people)
Living people
American folk singers
American women rock singers
Songwriters from California
American people of Iranian descent
American people of Russian descent
21st-century American women singers
21st-century American singers